Pelvis justo major (also called "Giant Pelvis") is a rare condition of the adult female pelvis where the pelvis flairs above the Iliopectineal line. It is 1.5 or more times larger than an average pelvis in every direction and is at least 42 cm (16.5 inches) biiliac width. Even though this condition is classified as a congenital abnormality, it is not a medical disease or abnormality of the pelvis (as the pelvis is a true gynecoid shape, only larger).

Women with this condition, at the time of delivery, may have a precipitous birth. There is virtually no resistance of the huge pelvic opening to the size of a newborn so only the soft parts resist the birth. With a huge Justo Major Pelvis, there is no pelvic bone "molding" of the fetal head. With the average pelvic size (2/3 or less Justo Major size) the usual pelvic molding process slows the birth, resulting in a slow and gradual stretching of the vaginal opening for primiparous women. When a huge Justo Major Pelvis allows such an extremely rapid vaginal birth, there can be tears of the perineal soft tissues. At the time of delivery the strong uterine contractions and maternal bearing down almost instantly overwhelm the integrity of a tightened and previously unstretched vaginal orifice. This is often the case if such women have not previously practiced vaginal stretching to the degree that allows such an instant birthing, especially so for a primiparous woman. This "instant delivery" problem causes many OBGYN doctors to stress the importance of women with a huge pelvis practicing pre-delivery vaginal stretching to avoid perineal injury.

Such a large size for the female pelvis is present in less than one in a thousand adult women. When women reach their maximum pelvis size, often by 21 years of age, if they have a huge pelvis the resulting big hips will not go away—no matter how much they diet, as bone will not shrink. It is not unusual for such women, whose pear shape is due to a huge pelvis, to give up watching calories for smaller hips... leading to obesity. However, such pear shaped obese women do not necessarily have a huge pelvis and a measurement scan or anthropometry by calipers is required to diagnose the Justo Major condition. The incidence of Justo Major Pelvis is not found to be a strictly standard deviation type variation as it follows a tail skewed deviation to the right. Incidence varies with geographic regions of the world (e.g. Poland has a high incidence). Justo Major Pelvis is classified as congenital and thought to be partially inherited, especially from the maternal side.

References 

Pelvis